R5 Highway is a  regional road corridor running from Harare to Mutare. It is also known as the A3 Highway. It is part of the Beira–Lobito Highway.

Background
In Harare the A3 Highway starts as Samora Machel Avenue (east), (   
) while the A5 Highway that runs from Harare to Bulawayo also begins as Samora Machel Avenue (west).

Those in and around Harare like to call it Mutare Road, while those in Mutare call it Harare Road. Together with the R2 Highway, it form the Plumtree-Bulawayo-Harare-Mutare Highway.

Operations

The R5 Highway links the Trans-African-Highway 9 to the Beira Corridor through the Machipanda Border Post east of Mutare. Together with the R3 it forms part of the Beira-Lobito Highway (the green route on this map)

Junctions

•	At Marondera the P3 Highway turns left (north) to Murehwa. Its common name is the Marondera-Murehwa Road @ .

       At Rusape the A14 Highway branches left (north) to Juliasdale and Nyanga @  .

•	At Nyazura the R6 Highway turns right (south) to Chivhu. Its common name is the Chivhu-Nyazura Road. 

       Just  before Mutare, the highway A15 branches right (north) to Juliasdale and through to Nyanga and the Eastern Highlands.

SOURCE: AA MAP

Waypoints

Major waypoints are 
 Marondera
 Rusape

See also
 Plumtree-Bulawayo-Harare-Mutare Highway
 Transport in Zimbabwe
 A9 Highway

References

Roads in Zimbabwe